Sykia is a small village on the northern coast of the Peloponnese peninsula in southern Greece, belonging to the municipality of Xylokastro in Corinthia. 

Populated places in Corinthia